The Badghyz and Karabil semi-desert ecoregion (WWF ID: PA1306) covers the hills north of the central mountain ranges of Afghanistan, southeast Turkmenistan, and portions of Uzbekistan and Tajikistan.  The landscape has been described as "savannah-like" and reminiscent of Africa, with desert sedges (Carex) and stands of wild pistachio trees (Pistacia vera).  The area supports high biodiversity and a number of rare and endemic species, such as the endangered Turkmenian kulan (Equus hemionus kulan).

Location and description 
The hilly ecoregion is situated between the large sandy Karakum desert to the north, the Koyentag ('Impassable') Mountains to the east, the Parapamiz Mountains of the Hindu Kush in Afghanistan to the south, and Kopet Dag Mountains of Turkmenistan and Iran to the southwest.  Throughout the region are large depressions of dried salt pans, supporting salt-tolerant plants.

Climate 
The climate of the ecoregion is Hot-summer Mediterranean climate (Köppen climate classification Csa). This climate is characterized hot, sometimes very hot, dry summers and mild, wet winters. Precipitation in the Badhyz Nature Reserve varies from 130 mm/year to 430 mm/year. Winds are often strong, typically from the North and Northwest.

Flora and fauna 
Biodiversity is high in the region, as the climate is relatively mild, and the location is in a transition zone that supports both Iranian-Afghan and Central Asian floral communities.  Over 1,100 species of vascular plants have been recorded in the region.  The dominant plants are desert sedges, particularly (Carex pachystylis).  Also found are Artemisia shrubs, Saltwort, and Saxaul. Protected areas have been set aside to protect groves of the wild Pistachio trees, with one covering 760 km2.

The region supports important populations of large mammals, such as the near-threatened Asiatic wild ass (Onager) and the Goitered gazelle.  The endangered Egyptian vulture is also found in the region.

Protections
Significant protected areas in the ecoregion include:
Köýtendag Nature Reserve
 Badhyz State Nature Reserve

References 

Ecoregions of Turkmenistan
Ecoregions of Afghanistan
Ecoregions of Uzbekistan
Ecoregions of Tajikistan
Ecoregions of Iran